Her Hidden Children: The Rise of Wicca and Paganism in America is a historical study of Wicca and Contemporary Paganism in the United States. It was written by the American academic Chas S. Clifton of Colorado State University-Pueblo, and published by AltaMira Press in 2005.

Her Hidden Children was reviewed in a number of academic journals.

Background
In 1999, the English historian Ronald Hutton of the University of Bristol had published his own study of Wiccan history, The Triumph of the Moon: A History of Modern Pagan Witchcraft.

Reception and recognition
The book received generally positive reviews from a number of academic journals.

References

Bibliography

 

Academic studies of ritual and magic
History books about witchcraft
Pagan studies books
2005 non-fiction books
2000s in modern paganism